Stylidium pedunculatum is a dicotyledonous plant that belongs to the genus Stylidium (family Stylidiaceae). It is an annual plant that grows from 5 to 10 cm tall. The linear or deltate leaves, about 20-200 per plant, are mostly in terminal rosettes but with some scattered along the elongate stem. The leaves are generally 4.5-8.5 mm long and 0.5-0.8 mm wide. Petioles are absent. This species produces 2-14 scapes per plant. Inflorescences are 4–7 cm long and produces a single white or pink flower that blooms from March to September in the southern hemisphere. S. pedunculatum'''s distribution is scattered in the tropical areas of Queensland and the Northern Territory and isolated in the Aru Islands. Its habitat is recorded as being damp, sandy soils in open Melaleuca viridiflora communities. It's been found in association with Drosera, Schoenus, and Utricularia species. S. pedunculatum is most closely associated with S. ericksoniae''. Its conservation status has been assessed as data deficient.

See also 
 List of Stylidium species

References 

Carnivorous plants of Australia
Carnivorous plants of Asia
Flora of the Maluku Islands
Flora of New Guinea
Flora of Queensland
Flora of the Northern Territory
pedunculatum
Plants described in 1810
Asterales of Australia